Andrew Marchand is an American senior sports media writer for the New York Post. Marchand earned his bachelor's degree in journalism from Ithaca College. He spent nine years as a reporter for the New York Post then in 2007 he became a regular contributor to ESPN programs such as SportsCenter, Baseball Tonight, ESPN News, and ESPN New York radio broadcasts. After 11 years at ESPN, Marchand rejoined the New York Post in 2018.

References 

American sports journalists
Ithaca College alumni